Siphonochelus stillacandidus is a species of sea snail, a marine gastropod mollusk in the family Muricidae, the murex snails or rock snails.

Description
The length of the shell attains 8.4 mm.

Distribution
This marine species occurs in the Mozambique Channel.

References

 Houart, R., 1985. Report on Muricidae (Gastropoda) recently dredged in the south-western Indian Ocean-I. Description of eight new species. Venus 44(3): 159-171

stillacandidus
Gastropods described in 1985